The New Administrative Capital Stadium is a stadium in Egypt's New Administrative Capital under construction since 2019. With an expected capacity of over 93,000 people, it will be the largest stadium in Egypt and the second largest in Africa, and is expected to replace the Cairo International Stadium as the new national stadium. It will be part of a larger sports complex that has been under construction since 2015. It will have a training ground, two indoor halls, an olympic-size swimming pool, and other buildings, and is being built with an eye toward the country's possible bids for the Olympic Games or a World Cup.

History 
Construction of the stadium began in 2019 as part of a large Olympic sports complex. It was designed by Italian firms SHESA Architects and MJW Structures, who had also worked on Juventus Stadium in Turin and the Paul Biya stadium in Yaoundè, Cameroon. Orascom Construction will be the main contractor. Completion is expected in June 2023.

Design 
The stadium is built on an elliptical ground plan. The roof is stylistically based on the headdress of Nefertiti, the ancient Egyptian queen. The Stadium will have a running track.

References 

Stadiums in Egypt